Jelena Dokić was the defending champion, but chose not to participate.
Irina-Camelia Begu won the tournament defeating Laura Pous Tió in the final 6–3, 7–5.

Seeds

  Simona Halep (semifinals)
  Irina-Camelia Begu (champion) 
  Sorana Cîrstea (quarterfinals)
  Petra Martić (withdrew)
  Laura Pous Tió (final)
  Carla Suárez Navarro (semifinals)
  Maria Elena Camerin (quarterfinals)
  Renata Voráčová (second round)

Main draw

Finals

Top half

Bottom half

References
 Main Draw
 Qualifying Draw

BCR Open Romania Ladies - Singles
BCR Open Romania Ladies